Traveller Supplement 11: Library Data (N-Z) is a tabletop role-playing game supplement, written by John Harshman, Marc W. Miller, and Loren K. Wiseman for Traveller, and published by Game Designers' Workshop in 1982 as a digest-sized 48-page book. Library Data (N-Z) is an encyclopedia of information about the Traveller universe. Thirteen Traveller supplements were published. A single collected volume was published by Far Future Enterprises in 2000. 

Library Data (N-Z) is a sourcebook of data on the Imperium and its residents, including essays on Imperial Space, Imperial Nobility, a history of the Spinward Marches, and policies in the Solomani Rim, plus many short entries, including coverage of psionics, the Sword Worlds, the Sylean Federation, the Vargr, the Vegans, the Vilani, and the Zhodani.  It includes a region map of the Imperium.

Reception
William A. Barton reviewed Library Data (N-Z) in The Space Gamer No. 60. Barton commented that "Library Data (N-Z) should prove to be quite useful to any Traveller player or referee whose campaign is set in the official GDW universe."

Reviews
 Different Worlds #30 (Sept., 1983)

See also
 Traveller Supplement 8: Library Data (A-M)
 Classic Traveller Supplements

References

Role-playing game supplements introduced in 1982
Traveller (role-playing game) supplements